Khoshkedan may refer to:
 Khoshkedan-e Babakan, a village in Iran
 Khoshkedan-e Olya, a village in Iran